The Brindabella electorate is one of the five electorates for the unicameral 25-member Australian Capital Territory Legislative Assembly. It elects five members, and is the largest of the electorates in geographic area.

History
It was created in 1995, when the three-electorate, Hare-Clark electoral system was first introduced for the Australian Capital Territory (ACT). Prior to 1995, a multi-member single constituency existed for the whole of the ACT. "Brindabella" is derived from an indigenous word meaning "two kangaroo rats" and refers to the mountain range to the south and west of the ACT.

Location
The Brindabella electorate consists of the large part of the ACT south of the Murrumbidgee River, although this region is sparsely inhabited.

From 1995 to 2008 it contained the Canberra district of Tuggeranong, excluding Hume, and the Woden Valley suburbs of Chifley, Pearce and Torrens.

In 2008, a boundary re-distribution by the Australian Capital Territory Electoral Commission, resulted in the electorate covering the Woden Valley suburb of Farrer.

In the 2016 redistribution, the Woden Valley suburbs, the village of Uriarra, and the suburb of Kambah were transferred into the Murrumbidgee electorate. At the 2019 redistribution, the western side of Kambah was transferred back into Brindabella.

Members

1 Tony De Domenico (Liberal) resigned on 30 January 1997. Louise Littlewood (Liberal) was elected as his replacement on a countback and was sworn in on 18 February 1997.
2 Trevor Kaine was elected on the Liberal ticket. From 1989 to 13 May 1998, Kaine sat as a Liberal. In late May, Kaine announced he would sit as a Canberra Liberal, and on 30 July 1998, Kaine announced that he had registered the United Canberra Party and sat in the Assembly as its sole representative.
3 Zed Seselja (Liberal) resigned on 11 June 2013. Nicole Lawder (Liberal) was elected as his replacement on a countback on 28 June 2013.
4 Brendan Smyth (Liberal) resigned on 15 July 2016. Val Jeffery (Liberal) was elected as his replacement on a countback on 28 July 2016.

See also
 Australian Capital Territory Electoral Commission
 Australian Capital Territory Legislative Assembly

References

External links
Australian Capital Territory Electoral Commission
 ACT Legislative Assembly - List of Members (1989 - 2008)

Electorates of the Australian Capital Territory